Walson Gardener (born August 21, 1932, in Laurinburg, North Carolina) is a retired NASCAR Grand National driver and a competitor at the 1968 Fireball 300. His best race was the 1968 Western North Carolina 500 where he finished in 8th place and accumulated ($ when adjusted for inflation) in prize winnings after finishing 438 laps out of the 500 laps of that particular race.

References

1932 births
Living people
People from Laurinburg, North Carolina
NASCAR drivers
Racing drivers from North Carolina